Jefferson Township is an inactive township in Cole County, in the U.S. state of Missouri.

Jefferson Township took its name from Jefferson City.

References

Townships in Missouri
Townships in Cole County, Missouri
Jefferson City metropolitan area